Lophotriccus is a genus of South American birds in the tyrant flycatcher family Tyrannidae.

The genus was introduced by the German ornithologist Hans von Berlepsch in 1884. The type species was subsequently designated as a subspecies of the scale-crested pygmy tyrant (Lophotriccus pileatus squamaecrista) by the English zoologist Richard Bowdler Sharpe in 1884. The genus name combines the Ancient Greek lophos meaning "crest" with trikkos which is an unidentified small bird. In ornithology triccus is used to denote a tyrant flycatcher.

Species
The genus contains the following four species:

References

 
Bird genera
Taxonomy articles created by Polbot